Old people's home may refer to:

 Retirement home, a multi-residence housing facility for the elderly
 Nursing home, a residential facility with nursing care for elderly or disabled people 
 Old People's Home (Omaha), Nebraska, U.S.
 Old People's Home (Tampa, Florida), U.S.
 Old People's Home for 4 Year Olds, a 2019 Australian television series based on the 2017 British series